Trox contractus is a beetle of the Family Trogidae.

References 

contractus
Beetles described in 1940